Citizens' Coalition for Economic Justice (CCEJ) is a citizens' movement in South Korea, which was founded in 1989. The movement works for economic justice, protection of the environment, for the reunification of Korea and for democratic and social development. Though it was founded not even twenty-five years ago, it has grown to encompass 35,000 members and 35 branches.

In voicing the concerns of citizens, CCEJ has achieved improvements within education, developed policy alternatives, and lobbied for legal reforms. It organizes many public discussions and hearings and informs the press about the concerns of citizens. It has expanded its goal of economic justice on a global level.

In 2003, CCEJ received the Right Livelihood Award for its efforts in creating a "reform programme, based on social justice."

References

External links
CCEJ website
Right Livelihood Award recipient

Political organizations based in South Korea